Integral Forex, a branch of Integral Securities, is a Turkey-based financial trading services provider specialized in foreign exchange (forex) and contract for difference (CFD) brokerage.

The company was founded in 1998 and is headquartered in Istanbul, Turkey, with representative offices in major cities of Turkey, such as Ankara, Gaziantep, Antalya, and Izmir.

The company is registered with and regulated by The Capital Markets Board of Turkey (CMB).

Integral Forex provides trading in foreign exchange (FX, Forex), futures, contract for difference (CFDs) on major indices and commodities and precious metals such as gold, silver and crude oil.

The company serves retail, professional and institutional clients and provides 24-hour access to the financial trading services through proprietary and third-party online trading platforms, including WebTrader, MobileTrader (Android & iOS) and the widely used electronic trading software MetaTrader, allowing traders to apply Expert Advisor (EA) strategies.

History
The company was originally established in Turkey in 1998 by Sabri Hakkı Ulukartal. After initially starting Forex trading services as  Ulukartal Kiymetli Madenler, the company acquired 2 stock exchange brokerage firms registered with and regulated by the CMB, and he founded Ulukartal Holding. The company has been admitted as a trade member to both the (IAB) Istanbul Gold Exchange (2002) and (DGCX) Dubai Gold & Commodities Exchange (2006)

The founder Sabri Hakkı Ulukartal graduated from the Boston University, Financial School of Management with an honorary degree. He has worked tirelessly in contact with the governing bodies regarding the legal and regulatory framework of the Forex trading business to be properly established in Turkey, but he faced the tragedy of an untimely death at the age of 43.

The parent company Integral Securities is one of the first 7 forex firms to be licensed temporarily by the CMB in 2011. Integral Securities is one of the first 3 forex firms to obtain a full forex license in Turkey by the CMB in March 2012. The company also has derivatives trading licenses with the Borsa Istanbul (BIST).

Integral Forex has formed a partnership in March 2013, with the Swiss forex bank Dukascopy, and became the first broker to provide Swiss-made trading platform JForex to its clients in Turkey.

Sponsorships
The company has used a number of sponsorships to promote its business, these include;
 Sponsor of Beşiktaş Men's Basketball Team since 2013.
 Sponsor of 60th Annual Milliyet Sportsperson of the Year Award.
 Sponsor of the 1st Annual 2014 Istanbul Forex Exhibition by Forextraview.
 Main Sponsor of the FX World Istanbul Forex & Derivatives Expo 2014.
 Sponsored 2014 Turkey FX Conference by Forex Magnates.

References

Financial services companies established in 1998
Companies based in Istanbul
Financial services companies of Turkey
Online brokerages
Financial derivative trading companies
Foreign exchange companies